The Green-Tweed GT-2 was an American, FAI Open Class single seat glider that was designed by George Tweed Jr and Jack Green.

Design and development
The GT-2 was completed in 1963 and was intended to make up the performance deficiencies in the Tweed GT-1. The GT-2 had a   span wing and a V-tail.

Only one GT-2 was built and the aircraft was registered in the Experimental - Amateur-Built category.

Operational history
The GT-2 was destroyed in a crash in 1969 when its ailerons became disconnected.

Specifications (GT-2)

See also

References

External links

1960s United States sailplanes
Homebuilt aircraft
Aircraft first flown in 1963
V-tail aircraft